Mr. Potter of Texas is an 1888 novel by the British-born American writer Archibald Clavering Gunter.

Adaptation
In 1922 it was adapted into a silent film of the same title directed by Leopold Wharton and starring Macklyn Arbuckle and Corene Uzzell.

References

Bibliography
 Goble, Alan. The Complete Index to Literary Sources in Film. Walter de Gruyter, 199
 Munden, Kenneth White. The American Film Institute Catalog of Motion Pictures Produced in the United States, Part 1. University of California Press, 1997.

1888 American novels
Novels by Archibald Clavering Gunter
American novels adapted into films